{{DISPLAYTITLE:N-Benzoyl-N'-phenylurea}}

N-Benzoyl-N′-phenylurea is an organic compound with PhCONHCONHPh formula. It is benzoylurea derivative substituted with phenyl group on the opposite nitrogen atom.

Structure and bonding

Structure of N-benzoyl-N′-phenylurea was first determined in 2010. Molecules in this compound are approximately flat and exhibit high charge delocalization. Within the molecule an intramolecular N−H⋅⋅⋅O hydrogen bond is present forming pseudoaromatic 6-membered ring. Additionally intermolecular N−H⋅⋅⋅O hydrogen bonds are also present combining two molecules into a centrosymmetric dimer (8-membered ring is formed).

Carbonyl C=O bond distances are equal to ca. 1.23 Å, C−N distances are in range of 1.34 to 1.41 Å.

Synthesis

In 1965 N-benzoyl-N′-phenylurea was synthesized when dry N-chlorobenzamide was reacted with phenylisocyanate or refluxed in dry benzene with anhydrous potassium fluoride. Alternatively N-benzoyl-N′-phenylurea was synthesized in 2010 by hydrolysis of N-benzoyl-N′-phenylthiourea.

References

Ureas
Phenyl compounds